The Bowatenna Dam is a  high gravity dam at Bowatenna, in the (Pilihudugolla Village) Naula, Central Province of Sri Lanka.

Reservoir and spillways 

Power station 

See also 

 Electricity in Sri Lanka
 List of dams and reservoirs in Sri Lanka
 List of power stations in Sri Lanka

References 

Bowatenna
Gravity dams
Hydroelectric power stations in Sri Lanka
Dams completed in 1981
Buildings and structures in Matale District